Sapronov (feminine: Sapronova) is a Russian-language surname.

Irina Saltykova (born 1966), née Sapronova
Timofei Sapronov (1887–1937), Russian revolutionary, Old Bolshevik, and socialist militant
Valentyn Sapronov (1932–2019), Ukrainian association footballer
Vitaly Sapronov (born 1945), Soviet rower